Esther Hallam Meynell née Moorhouse (1878 – 4 February 1955) was an English writer.

Biography
Meynell was born in Leeds, West Riding of Yorkshire. Her father was the Yorkshire Quaker Samuel Moorhouse. The family moved to Sussex when Esther was ten. She married Gerard Tuke Meynell and was the niece by marriage of the poet and suffragist Alice Meynell. She died in Ditchling, a village near Brighton, Sussex.

She is best known for The Little Chronicle of Magdalena Bach, a fictional autobiography of Anna Magdalena Bach, the wife of composer Johann Sebastian Bach. Other novels also included musical themes: the principal character of Grave Fairytale is reminiscent of Beethoven, while the hero of Quintet is a world famous pianist. Time's Door (1935) belongs to the genre of fantastic fiction; it features a violinist who "timeslips" to the 18th century where he becomes involved with Bach.

Nelson’s Lady Hamilton, about the life of Emma, Lady Hamilton, mistress of Lord Nelson, also became well known. English Spinster: a portrait is a fictional treatment of the life of Mary Russell Mitford, author of Our Village. Meynell also wrote many books about the County of Sussex, where she lived, at first in Pulborough. Sussex Cottage (1936) and Building a Cottage (1937) described the building of her small house in Ditchling, where she died in February 1955. The house has since been extended.

Works

As E. Hallam Moorhouse
 Nelson's Lady Hamilton, (1906)
 Samuel Pepys: Administrator, Observer, Gossip, (1909)
 Letters Of The English Seamen, (1910)
 Wordsworth, (1911)
 Nelson In England: A Domestic Chronicle, (1913)
 Sea Magic, (1916)

As Esther Meynell
 The Story Of Hans Andersen, (1924)
 The Little Chronicle Of Magdalena Bach, (1925)
 Grave Fairytale, (1931)
 Quintet, (1933)
 Bach ('Great Lives' series, 1933)
 Time's Door, (1935)
 Sussex Cottage, (1936)
 Building A Cottage, (1937)
 Lucy And Amades, (1938)
 English Spinster: A Portrait, (1939)
 A Woman Talking, (1940)
 Country Ways, (1942)
 The Young Lincoln, (1944)
 Cottage Tale, (1945)
 Sussex, (County Books series) (1947)
 Portrait Of William Morris, (1947)
 Tale Told To Terry, (1950)
 Small Talk In Sussex, (1954)
 
Source:

References

External links 
 
 Esther Meynell at Musik und Gender im Internet
 

1878 births
1955 deaths
20th-century English women writers
20th-century English novelists
English women novelists
People from Ditchling